Calcium/calmodulin-dependent protein kinase type II gamma chain is an enzyme that in humans is encoded by the CAMK2G gene.

Function 

The product of this gene belongs to the Serine/Threonine protein kinase family, and to the Ca(2+)/calmodulin-dependent protein kinase subfamily. Calcium signaling is crucial for several aspects of plasticity at glutamatergic synapses. In mammalian cells the enzyme is composed of four different chains: alpha, beta, gamma, and delta. The product of this gene is a gamma chain. Six alternatively spliced variants that encode six different isoforms have been characterized to date. Additional alternative splice variants that encode different isoforms have been described, but their full-length nature has not been determined.

Interactions 
CAMK2G has been shown to interact with RRAD.

See also 
 Ca2+/calmodulin-dependent protein kinase

References

Further reading

External links
 
 

EC 2.7.11